Owen Nuttridge is a former association football goalkeeper who represented New Zealand at international level.

Having already represented New Zealand at U-23 level, Nuttridge played two official A-international matches for the New Zealand, making his debut as a substitute in an 8–2 win over Malaysia on 16 November 1967, replacing Neville Siebert in goal for the second half. His second official appearance didn't come until nearly eight years later in a 2–0 win over China on 26 July 1975.

References 

Year of birth missing (living people)
Living people
New Zealand association footballers
New Zealand international footballers
Association football goalkeepers